Nicholas S. Zeppos (born 1955) is an American lawyer and university administrator. He was the eighth chancellor of Vanderbilt University in Nashville, Tennessee. On April 2, 2019, Zeppos announced that he would be stepping down from the position on August 15 of the same year.

Early life
Nicholas Zeppos was born in Milwaukee, Wisconsin in 1955. He received his B.A. in history in 1976 and his J.D. in 1979 from the University of Wisconsin–Madison. In 1978 and 1979, he served as the editor-in-chief of the Wisconsin Law Review.

Career
Zeppos started his career as a practicing attorney in Washington, D.C. He joined the faculty of the Vanderbilt Law School in 1987. During his tenure at Vanderbilt, he has held a number of posts, including professor of law, associate dean of the law school, associate provost for academic affairs, vice chancellor for institutional planning and advancement, and, in 2001, provost and vice chancellor for academic affairs. In this last role, he oversaw academics, development, alumni relations, and residential and student life. After Gordon Gee's departure in 2007, he was named interim chancellor. He was named chancellor suo jure on March 1, 2008, by the university's Board of Trust. In 2009, he helped lead an expanded financial aid program called Opportunity Vanderbilt that replaced undergraduate need-based loans with grant and scholarship assistance.

He has also written widely on legislation, administrative law, and professional responsibility. He has served as the chair of the Scholars Committee on the Federal Judiciary and as chair of the Rules Advisory Committee of the U.S. Court of Appeals for the Sixth Circuit.

Zeppos was appointed to the National Security Higher Education Advisory Board, a program of the Federal Bureau of Investigation in 2005. He serves as the Chair of the Association of American Universities and on the Board of Directors of Fulbright Canada.

Personal life
Zeppos is married to Lydia Howarth, a writer, and has two sons. His salary as chancellor was over $2.2 million.

According to OpenSecrets, Zeppos has contributed nearly $70,000 to Democrats, including Barack Obama and Elizabeth Warren, but has contributed also to Republicans including Bob Corker, Rick Perry, and Lamar Alexander.

References

1954 births
Living people
American people of Greek descent
Lawyers from Milwaukee
People from Nashville, Tennessee
University of Wisconsin Law School alumni
University of Wisconsin–Madison College of Letters and Science alumni
Lawyers from Washington, D.C.
Vanderbilt University faculty
Chancellors of Vanderbilt University